The Hurricane is a 1937 film set in the South Seas, directed by John Ford and produced by Samuel Goldwyn Productions, about a Polynesian who is unjustly imprisoned. The climax features a special effects hurricane. It stars Dorothy Lamour and Jon Hall, with Mary Astor, C. Aubrey Smith, Thomas Mitchell, Raymond Massey, John Carradine, and Jerome Cowan. James Norman Hall, Jon Hall's uncle, co-wrote the novel of the same name on which The Hurricane is based.

Plot 
As a passenger ship sails by the bleak ruins of a deserted island, Dr. Kersaint (Thomas Mitchell) blows his former home a kiss. When a fellow passenger (Inez Courtney) asks him about the place, he tells its tragic story, segueing into a flashback.

During the colonial era in the South Pacific, the natives of the island of Manakoora are a contented lot. Terangi (Jon Hall), the first mate on an island-hopping schooner, marries Marama (Dorothy Lamour), the daughter of the chief (Al Kikume). She has a premonition and begs him not to leave, or at least take her with him on the ship's next voyage, but he makes her stay behind.

Upon reaching Tahiti, the crew goes to a bar to celebrate. When a racist white man orders them to leave, Terangi strikes him and breaks his jaw. Unfortunately, the man has strong political connections, and the governor is forced to sentence him to six months in jail, over the objections of Terangi's captain, Nagle (Jerome Cowan).  Back on Manakoora, Dr. Kersaint begs recently appointed local French Governor Eugene De Laage (Raymond Massey) to have Terangi brought home to serve his sentence under parole, but De Laage refuses to compromise his stern interpretation of the law, despite the pleas of Captain Nagle, Father Paul (C. Aubrey Smith), and even his own wife (Mary Astor).

Unable to bear being confined, Terangi repeatedly tries to escape, eventually lengthening his sentence to 16 years, much to the delight of a particularly harsh jailer (John Carradine). Finally, after eight years, Terangi succeeds in escaping, but unintentionally kills a guard. He steals a canoe and returns to Manakoora after an arduous journey. At the end, he is rescued from his overturned canoe by Father Paul, who promises to remain silent.

Terangi is reunited with Marama and a daughter (Kuulei De Clercq) he has never seen before. Chief Mehevi recommends the family hide on a tabu island, where no one will look for them. However, De Laage discovers their preparations and commandeers the schooner to hunt them down.

Terangi turns back to warn his people after he sees birds fleeing the island, an unprecedented, ominous event that Marama had dreamed about many years before. A once-in-a-lifetime hurricane strikes the island. A few, among them Dr. Kersaint and his pregnant patient, weather the disaster in a canoe, while Terangi ties his family and Madame De Laage to a stout tree. The rest drown, and the island is stripped bare.

The tree floats away. Terangi later finds a war canoe in the water, which he uses to get his party to a small island. When they spot the schooner, Terangi signals it with smoke before fleeing in the canoe with his family. Governor De Laage embraces his wife, but then spots something on the water through his binoculars. Madame De Laage insists it must be a floating log; after a pause, her husband agrees with her.

Cast 
 Dorothy Lamour as Marama
 Jon Hall as Terangi
 Mary Astor as Madame Germaine De Laage
 C. Aubrey Smith as Father Paul
 Thomas Mitchell as Dr. Kersaint
 Raymond Massey as Governor Eugene De Laage
 John Carradine as Warden
 Jerome Cowan as Captain Nagle
 Al Kikume as Chief Mehevi
 Kuulei De Clercq as Tita
 Layne Tom Jr. as Mako
 Mamo Clark as Hitia
 Movita Castaneda as Arai

Production
Actor Jon Hall had appeared in a number of roles under different names. He kept the name "Jon Hall" for the rest of his career.

Awards and nominations 
The film was nominated for three Academy Awards, winning in the category for Best Sound.

 Best Sound Recording - Thomas T. Moulton
 Best Supporting Actor (nomination) - Thomas Mitchell
 Best Music, Score (nomination) - Alfred Newman

Critical reception 
The New York Times critic Frank S. Nugent praised the climactic special effect created by James Basevi, stating, "It is a hurricane to blast you from the orchestra pit to the first mezzanine. It is a hurricane to film your eyes with spin-drift, to beat at your ears with its thunder, to clutch at your heart and send your diaphragm vaulting over your floating rib into the region just south of your tonsils." He complimented the performances of all of the principal actors with the exception of Hall, whose Terangi was described as "a competent Tarzan". Nugent also faulted the uneven pacing, but in the end, characterized the film as "one of the most thrilling spectacles the screen has provided this year."

Literary references 
In his memoir La tregua ("The Truce"; re-titled The Reawakening for publication in the U.S.), Primo Levi recounted his experience watching The Hurricane among other films while he was interned at a Soviet transit camp at Starye Dorogi in the aftermath of World War II. The audience of Soviet troops, former prisoners of war, and Holocaust survivors (Levi included) became more and more unruly as the movie progressed, culminating in what Levi called a "witches' sabbath" when the actual hurricane appeared on screen. A fight broke out in the cramped theater, during which some of the troops attempted to climb poles to reach rooms occupied by women, adjacent to the balcony. Several of the Italians ran up the stairs to come to the women's defence, pushing the poles away from the balcony. Due to the frenzy, the projectionist decided to shut off the film before the end, to Levi's dismay (he recalled the film as "quite a good American film of the thirties").

Remake 
A remake of this movie was released in 1979, directed by Jan Troell and starring Jason Robards Jr. and Mia Farrow.

Home media
The Hurricane was released on Blu-ray and DVD by Kino Lorber Studio Classics in November 2015.

References

External links 

 
 
 
 
 The Hurricane at Virtual History

1937 films
1937 drama films
American black-and-white films
American disaster films
American drama films
Films about tropical cyclones
Films based on American novels
Films directed by John Ford
Films directed by Stuart Heisler 
Films scored by Alfred Newman
Films set in French Polynesia
Films set on fictional islands
Films that won the Best Sound Mixing Academy Award
1930s prison films
Samuel Goldwyn Productions films
Films with screenplays by Dudley Nichols
United Artists films
1930s disaster films
1930s English-language films
1930s American films